is the brandname of the Japanese eyewear manufacturer  located in Osaka, Japan.

Founded in 1911, the company produces and sells optical lenses, sunglasses, goggles, as well as safety glasses. The sports eyewear brand Swans includes sunglasses, ski and snowboard goggles, swimming goggles, as well as helmets.

The company was founded by Haruji Yamamoto, as Yamamoto Optical Lens Factory, in Osaka. The factory moved to Higashiōsaka in 1935, where the company's current headquarters are. In that same year started the production of lenses and eyewear for protection against dust. Twenty years later the company name changed to Yamamoto Bojin Megane and started the production of  eyewear frames by plastic molding, a first in Japan. In 1977 the company became as an official ski equipment supplier to the United States Ski Team and in 1980 the company's took its current name.

In October 2014, the Toshiba Glass, a pair of optical head-mounted display-like glasses, which was jointly created by Yamamoto Kogaku and Toshiba, was unveiled at CEATEC 2014.

References

External links
 
Official Website
Magnetic Sunglasses
Official Yamamoto Kogaku Co., Ltd. Website
"Swans Way", Highlighting Japan, May 2010
Swans South East Asia Distributor official website

Sporting goods manufacturers of Japan
Eyewear brands of Japan
Manufacturing companies established in 1911
Japanese companies established in 1911
Companies based in Osaka Prefecture
Swimming equipment
Sunglasses
Skiing equipment
Sportswear brands
Japanese brands
Eyewear companies of Japan